The 2015 World Allround Speed Skating Championships were held in Calgary, Alberta, Canada, from 7 to 8 March 2015.

Schedule

Participating nations
48 speed skaters (24 men, 24 women) from 18 nations participated. The number of speed skaters per nation that competed is shown in parentheses.

Medal summary

Medal table

Medalists

References

External links
ISU website

 
World Allround Speed Skating Championships
World Allround Speed Skating Championships
2015 Allround
World Allround, 2015
2015 World Allround Speed Skating Championships
World Allround Speed Skating Championships
2010s in Calgary
World Allround Speed Skating Championships